Shadman may refer to:

 a Mega Man character; see List of Mega Man characters#Robot Masters
 Shadman, Iran (disambiguation), places in Iran
Shademan Metro Station, in Tehran, Iran